Copromorpha efflorescens is a moth in the family Copromorphidae. It is found in Sri Lanka.

References

Natural History Museum Lepidoptera generic names catalog

Copromorphidae
Moths described in 1906